is the third compilation album by the Japanese girl band Princess Princess, released on February 1, 1996, by Sony Records during the band's farewell tour. The album compiles the band's singles and select tracks from 1987 to 1995.

The album peaked at No. 3 on Oricon's albums chart. It was also certified Platinum by the RIAJ.

Track listing 
All music is composed by Kaori Okui, except where indicated; all music is arranged by Princess Princess and Masanori Sasaji.

Charts

Certification

References

External links
 
 
 

Princess Princess (band) compilation albums
1996 compilation albums
Compilation albums by Japanese artists
Sony Music Entertainment Japan compilation albums
Japanese-language compilation albums